Ibrahim (also spelled Ibraheem) is the Arabic name of the prophet and patriarch Abraham and one of Allah's messengers in the Quran. It is a common first name and surname among Muslims and Arab Christians, a cognate of the name Abraham or Avram in Judaism and Christianity in the Middle East. In the Levant and Maghreb, Brahim and Barhoum are  common diminutives for the first name Ibrahim.

Given name 
Ibrahim ibn Muhammad (died 632), was the third son of the Islamic prophet Muhammad.
Ibrahim (died 750), the Umayyad caliph and a son of Caliph al-Walid I
Ibrahim ibn al-Mahdi (779–839) was an Abbasid prince, singer, composer and poet. He was the son of the third Abbasid caliph Al-Mahdi.
Ibrahim ibn Salih (died 792) Abbasid governor of various provinces in Syria and Egypt in the late eighth century. 
Ibrahim ibn Jaʿfar or Al-Muttaqi (died 968), Caliph of Baghdad during Later Abbasid period
Ibrahim ibn Jaʿfar al-Muqtadir, was the Abbasid prince and son of Caliph al-Muqtadir.
Ibrahim ibn Ahmad Al-Mustazhir (1112–1114), was the son of caliph Al-Mustazhir and his wife, the Seljuk princess Ismah.
Ibrahim Lodhi (1480–1526) was the Sultan of the Lodi Empire from 1517 to 21 April 1526.
Ibrahim (1615–1648), Ottoman sultan
Ibrahim I of Shirvan (r. 1382–1417), ruler of Shirvan from the Derbendid dynasty
Ibrahim Abatcha (1938–1968), Chadian politician
Ibrahim Artan Ismail Somali politician, former Minister of Security of Puntland
Ibrahim Abouleish (born 1937), Egyptian scientist
Ibrahim Abu-Lughod (1929–2001), Palestinian academic
Ibrahim Afellay (born 1986), Dutch footballer
Ibrahim Ahmad (1914–2000), Kurdish politician
Ibrahim Ali Tashna (1872–1931), Bengali poet and Islamic scholar
Ibrahim Arman Loni (1983–2019), Pashtun human rights activist
Ibrahim Ba (born 1973), Senegalese-French footballer
Ibrahim Babangida (born 1941), 8th President of Nigeria
İbrahim Balaban (born 1921), Turkish painter
Ibrahim Benoh, Jordanian-born American artist and educator
Ibrahim Bey (1735–1833), Egyptian Mamluk chieftain of Georgian origin
Ibrahim Bilali (born 1965), Kenyan boxer
Ibrahim Böhme (1944–1999), German politician
Ibrahim Deif (born 1962), Egyptian academic 
Ibrahim Ismail Chundrigar (1897–1960), Pakistani politician
Ibrahim Fazeel (born 1980), Maldivian footballer
Ibrahim Ferrer (1927–2005), Afro-Cuban singer
Ibrahim of Johor (1873–1959), Sultan of Johor, Malaysia
Ibrahim Halidi (born 1954), Prime Minister of Comoros
Ibrahim Hashem (1878–1958), Jordanian lawyer and politician
Ibrahim Heski (died 1931), Kurdish politician
Ibrahim Hussein (disambiguation)
Ibrahim Kargbo (born 1982), Sierra Leonean footballer
Ibrahim of Kazan (r. 1467–1479), ruler of Kazan Khanate
Ibrahim Zeid Keilani (1937–2013), Jordanian politician
Ibrahim Maalouf (born 1980), Lebanese jazz musician
Ibrahim Masod, Singaporean convicted murderer 
Ibrahim Meraachli (died 2004), Lebanese actor
Ibrahim Al-Mudhaf (1852–1928), Kuwaiti politician
Ibrahim Mohamed (1965–2002), Singaporean murderer
Ibrahim Muteferrika (1674–1745), Ottoman diplomat, printer, and polymath
Ibrahim Nagi (1898–1953), Egyptian poet
Ibrahim Najjar, Lebanese politician
Ibrahim Nasir (1926–2008), Maldivian politician
Ibrahim Nasrallah (born 1954), Palestinian poet
Ibrahim Nooraddeen (died 1892), Sultan of the Maldives
Ibrahim Orabi (born 1912), Egyptian wrestler
Ibrahim Pasha (disambiguation), several pashas named Ibrahim
Ibrahim Rabimov (born 1987), Tajikistani footballer
 Ibrahim Said (footballer, born 1979)
 Ibrahim Said (footballer, born 2002)
Ibrahim Sanjaya (born 1997), Indonesian footballer
Ibrahim Al-Shahrani (born 1974), Saudi Arabian footballer
Ibrahim Isaac Sidrak (born 1955), Patriarch of Alexandria
Ibrahim Sirkeci (born 1972), Turkish management scientist
Ibrahim Tounkara (born 1976), Canadian football player
Ibrahim Traoré (born c. 1988), Burkinabé military officer
Ibrahim Ujani (1863–1943), Bengali qari and teacher
Ibrahim "Baim" Wong (born 1981), Indonesian artist
Ibrahim Yattara (born 1980), Guinean footballer
Ibrahim al-Yaziji (died 1906), Lebanese writer
Ibrahim ibn Yuhanna (ca. 950s–ca. 1030s), Byzantine translator and author
Ibrahim Zarman (born 1997), Indonesian taekwondo practitioner

İbrahim
İbrahim Akın (born 1984), Turkish footballer
Ibrahim Alemi, Iranian politician
İbrahim Arat (born 1988), Turkish weightlifter
İbrahim Aydemir (born 1983), Turkish footballer
İbrahim Aydın or Cihangirzade İbrahim Bey (1874–1948), Turkish military officer and statesman
İbrahim Bölükbaşı (born 1990), Turkish wrestler
Ibrahim Haddad (born 1938), Syrian politician
Ibrahim Al Hilbawi (1858–1940), Egyptian jurist and politician
İbrahim Kaş (born 1986), Turkish footballer
İbrahim Öztürk (born 1981), German footballer
Ibrahim Shoukry (1916–2008), Egyptian politician
İbrahim Şahin (footballer) (born 1984), Turkish footballer
İbrahim Tatlıses, Turkish folk singer of Kurdish origins
İbrahim Toraman (born 1981), Turkish footballer
İbrahim Üzülmez (born 1974), Turkish footballer

Ebrahim
Ebrahim Afshar (died 1748), king of Iran
Ebrahim Alkazi (born 1925), Indian theatre director and drama teacher
Ebrahim Mirzapour (born 1978), Iranian football goalkeeper
Ebrahim Nabavi (born 1958), Iranian satirist and writer
Ebrahim Rasool (born 1962), Premier of the Western Cape province in South Africa

Ibraheem
Ibraheem Samirah (born 1991), American politician and member of the Virginia House of Delegates

Surname or patronymic

Ibrahim
Abdisalam Ibrahim
Abdullah Ibrahim (born 1934), South African pianist and composer
Andrew Ibrahim (born 1989), English student convicted of "preparing terrorist acts"
Anwar Ibrahim (born 1947), Malaysian politician
Dawood Ibrahim (born 1955), Indian mobster
Deren Ibrahim (born 1991), Gibraltarian footballer
Fauziah Ibrahim, Australian broadcast journalist
George Ibrahim (died 2003), Pakistani Roman Catholic priest
Gihan Ibrahim (born 1986/1987), Egyptian activist and citizen journalist
Hanan Ibrahim, Somali activist
Hassan Ibrahim (1917–1990), Egyptian military officer and politician 
Ibrahim Namo Ibrahim (born 1937), Chaldean Catholic bishop in the United States
Idil Ibrahim, Somali filmmaker
Indra Wijaya Ibrahim, Singaporean convicted murderer
John Ibrahim (born 1970), Lebanese-Australian nightclub entrepreneur
Jamaludin Ibrahim, Singaporean convicted killer
Kamal Ibrahim (wrestler) (born 1961), Egyptian Olympic wrestler
Kamala Ibrahim (born 1939), Sudanese artist
Keria Ibrahim, Ethiopian politician
Khalil Ibrahim, Sudanese Islamist
Moussa Ibrahim (born 1974), Libyan political figure
Muhammad Ibrahim (1911–1989), Bangladeshi physician
Muhammad Ibrahim (justice) (1894–1966), Bengali justice and academic
Musa Ibrahim (born 1979), Bangladeshi mountaineer
Raymond Ibrahim (born 1973), Coptic American research librarian, translator, author and columnist with focus in Arab history and language
Sarimah Ibrahim (born 1978), Malaysian television host, actress and singer
Sonallah Ibrahim (born 1937), Egyptian novelist and short story writer
Waleed bin Ibrahim Al Ibrahim (born 1962), Saudi Arabian businessman
Yaacob Ibrahim (born 1955), Minister for Communications and Information, Minister in charge of Muslim Affairs and the Minister in charge of Cyber Security of Singapore

Ebrahim
Abul Fadl Mohsin Ebrahim
Armaan Ebrahim
Kate Ebrahim
Chit Lwin Ebrahim
Currimbhoy Ebrahim
Dion Ebrahim (born 1980), Zimbabwean cricketer
Fakhruddin G. Ebrahim
Fareed Ebrahim
Ismail Ebrahim (1946–2020), South African cricketer
M. M. Ebrahim
Murad Ebrahim
Omar Ebrahim
Roshanara Ebrahim
Vincent Ebrahim
Vinette Ebrahim
Zofeen T. Ebrahim

See also

Surnames of Nigerien origin
Abraham in Islam
Arabic-language surnames
Arabic masculine given names
Iranian masculine given names
Turkish masculine given names
Surnames of Maldivian origin
Maldivian-language surnames
sv:Ibrahim (namn)